North Carolina Highway 8 (NC 8) is a primary state highway in the U.S. state of North Carolina. The route connects the cities of Lexington and Winston-Salem to various recreational and natural sites including Uwharrie National Forest, High Rock Lake and Hanging Rock State Park.

Route description
NC 8 begins with NC 740 at the intersection with US 52 and Gold Street, in New London. After a short concurrency with NC 740, it goes northeast to connect with NC 49, then travels briefly on divided four-lane through Rowan County and over the Yadkin River. After briefly serving as the northern perimeter for the Uwharrie National Forest, it splits with NC 49 and goes north to Southmont. Continuing north, it enters the Lexington city limits near I-85. Turning on Talbert Boulevard, it bypasses south of downtown Lexington, then continues north along Raleigh Road and the one-way streets of Fifth and Sixth streets. On the north side of Lexington, it connects with I-85 Business/US 29/US 64/US 70 before pressing on along Winston Road to Welcome, where it begins its longest concurrency with US 52.

With US 52, it bypasses east of Welcome and west of Midway before entering Winston-Salem, where the freeway becomes known as the North-South Expressway. With a brief concurrency with US 311, it eventually splits from US 52 at Germanton Road, where it continues along north as a two-lane rural highway. After joining with NC 65, it crosses into Stokes County and enters Germanton.  later, it splits north from NC 65 to meet-up with NC 89 and traverse through Danbury. Ending its last concurrency just north of Hanging Rock State Park, it continues north crossing NC 704 before ending at the Virginia state line. Continuing into Virginia, it becomes State Route 8, towards Stuart, Virginia.

History
In 1936, it was extended further south to Abbot Creek, passing through Southmont. In 1939, NC 8 was extended southeast on new primary routing, crossing Abbot Creek, to NC 62.  

In late 1940, NC 8 was extended north, in concurrency with US 52 to Winston-Salem, then replaced NC 109 in Forsyth and Stokes Counties to the Virginia state line, where it continued on as already existing SR 8. Between 1945-1949, NC 8 was rerouted north of Winston-Salem, from Indiana Avenue, Cherry Street and part of Germanton Road, and onto Patterson Avenue.

In 1953, NC 8 was extended southwest, with a short concurrency with NC 49 and replacing NC 6, to New London. In 1954, NC 8 was placed on one-way streets in downtown Winston-Salem, using 4th Street (southbound) and 5th Street (northbound). In 1960, NC 8 was moved from Main Street to Old Salem Road, in the Salem College area. In 1962, NC 8 was adjusted downtown Winston-Salem: northbound using Main Street–Fifth Street–Liberty Street, and southbound using Liberty Street–First Street. In 1967, NC 8 northbound was rerouted on a short concurrency with US 158/US 421 then north along a completed section of the North-South Freeway; NC 8 southbound remained unchanged until 1973, when the rest of the North-South Expressway was completed, eliminating its routing through downtown Winston-Salem.  In 1972, NC 8 was adjusted from Third Street to Sixth Street in Lexington.  In 1981, NC 8 was extended to Gold Street, then share short concurrency with NC 740 to its current southern terminus with US 52.  In 1982, US 52/NC 8 was placed on new freeway west of Midway.  Between 1991-1993, US 52/NC 8 was placed on new freeway bypassing east of Welcome. In 2002, NC 8 was rerouted in Lexington, from Main Street to continue along Raleigh Road to Talbert Boulevard then back to Cotton Grove Road.

Major intersections

See also
North Carolina Bicycle Route 4 - Concurrent with NC 8 between Sheppard Mill Road and Hanging Rock Park Road

References

External links

NCRoads.com: N.C. 8

008
Transportation in Stanly County, North Carolina
Transportation in Rowan County, North Carolina
Transportation in Davidson County, North Carolina
Transportation in Forsyth County, North Carolina
Transportation in Stokes County, North Carolina